Air Marshal Sir Robert Hamilton Clark-Hall  (21 June 1883 – 8 March 1964) was a squadron and wing commander in the Royal Naval Air Service during the First World War and a senior Royal Air Force commander in the 1920s and early 1930s. Clark-Hall returned to service during the Second World War after volunteering to serve with the Royal New Zealand Air Force.

First World War
Commanded the first seaplane carrier  at Gallipoli. He then commanded No. 1 Wing Royal Naval Air Service conducting surveillance and attacks on enemy shipping from St Pol-sur-Mer, Dunkirk between September 1916 and November 1918, and was awarded the Chevalier of the Legion of Honour for his services to the war in February 1919.

Second World War
At the outbreak of the Second World War, Clark-Hall was in his late-50s, retired and living in New Zealand. He volunteered to serve with the Royal New Zealand Air Force, and was granted a commission as a wing commander.  In May 1940 Clark-Hall was appointed the Officer Commanding RNZAF Harewood.  After receiving a promotion to group captain, in 1943 Clark-Hall was promoted again to air commodore and appointed Air Officer Commanding Southern (Training) Group. In October 1944, he became Air Officer Commanding No. 1 Islands Group in the Pacific Ocean. He retired from the Royal New Zealand Air Force on 12 September 1945.

References
Air of Authority – A History of RAF Organisation – Air Marshal Sir Robert Clark-Hall

Notes

|-

1883 births
1964 deaths
Chevaliers of the Légion d'honneur
Companions of the Order of St Michael and St George
Companions of the Distinguished Service Order
English emigrants to New Zealand
New Zealand Knights Commander of the Order of the British Empire
New Zealand military personnel of World War II
Royal Air Force air marshals
Royal Naval Air Service aviators
Royal Navy personnel of the Boxer Rebellion
Royal Navy personnel of World War I
Royal New Zealand Air Force personnel